Giorgio Serrallonga is an Italian film editor.

He edited Per qualche dollaro in piu along Eugenio Alabiso, by Sergio Leone, Car Crash (1981) and The Stranger and the Gunfighter (1974) by Anthony M. Dawson, and Un bambino di nome Gesù along Domenico Varone.

Filmography

References

Bibliography

External links
 

Date of birth missing
Possibly living people
Year of birth missing
Italian film editors
Television editors